The Zollenspieker Ferry is a ferry across the Elbe river (here Unterelbe) in Germany.

References

External links
 Ferry website 

Ferries across Elbe
Ferry transport in Hamburg
Ferry transport in Lower Saxony
Geography of Hamburg